Kutluk Yabgu Khagan was one of the last yabghus (rulers) of the Second Turkic Khaganate.

Background 
He was not a descendant of the former khagan. He was a yabgu (high officer) in the Khaganate. Tengri Qaghan was killed by Pan Kül Tigin, one of his shads (governors). However, Pan Kül Tigin was defeated by Basmyls, a Turkic tribe.

Reign and downfall 
During the interregnum after Pan Kül Tigin's death, Kutluk Yabgu, enthroned a son of Bilge Khagan as the new Khagan, but soon he changed sides and declared himself as the Khagan in 741.

In 742, the Tang emperor Xuanzong organized a secret alliance within the Turkic Khaganate. Basmyls, Uighurs and Karluks, the three Turkic tribes attacked capital. Kutluk Yabgu was killed. He was succeeded by Özmiş Khagan by some Turkic nobles. Meanwhile, Basmyl chief Ashina Shi also declared himself as khagan.

References

Göktürk khagans
742 deaths
Year of birth unknown
Tengrist monarchs